Boophis feonnyala is a species of frogs in the family Mantellidae.

It is endemic to Madagascar, known only from Andasibe-Mantadia National Park but it likely occurs more widespread. It is protected in the national park, but if it occurs elsewhere, it may be threatened by agriculture, timber extraction, charcoal manufacturing, invasive eucalyptus, livestock grazing and expanding human settlements.
Its natural habitats are subtropical or tropical moist lowland forests, rivers, freshwater lakes, heavily degraded former forest, and water storage areas.

References

External links
2006 IUCN Red List of Threatened Species  Downloaded on 23 July 2007.

feonnyala
Endemic frogs of Madagascar
Amphibians described in 2001
Taxonomy articles created by Polbot